The Land and Property Services (LPS) is an agency of the Department of Finance of the Northern Ireland Executive. The agency, created in 2008, includes the Ordnance Survey of Northern Ireland (the OSNI).

References 
 
 

Northern Ireland Executive
Organisations based in Belfast